The Cadillac Fairview Corporation Limited, branded as Cadillac Fairview, is a Canadian company that invests in, owns, and manages commercial real estate, mainly in Canada and the United States. As of March 2017, the company had 73 properties, encompassing 38 million square feet, worth over $29 billion.  As of September 2017, Cadillac Fairview's portfolio consisted of 60% Canadian retail (mainly major shopping centres) and 26% Canadian office buildings. Cadillac Fairview is wholly owned by the Ontario Teachers' Pension Plan.

History 
The name "Cadillac Fairview" came into existence in 1974 as a result of the merger between Cadillac Development Corporation Ltd and Fairview Corporation. Cadillac Development Corporation was founded by partners Ephraim Diamond (d. 2008), Joseph Berman (1922-2003), and Jack Kamin in Toronto in 1953 as a developers of high-rise apartment buildings. Fairview Corporation was established in 1958 as the real estate division of Cemp Investments, the holding company of the Bronfman family. Before merging, Cadillac and Fairview already had strong ties since 1968. Bronfman-held Cemp Investments sold Cadillac Fairview in 1986.

The company was purchased by the Ontario Teachers' Pension Plan in March 2000. In 2006 it expanded its operations to Brazil by buying 46 percent of Multiplan Emprendimentos Imobiliarios SA, a Brazilian shopping center manager worth more than $1 billion.  In 2013, it was tried under private prosecution by EcoJustice for causing hundreds of birds to die due to the glass panes at one of its Toronto office buildings. It won the case.  In 2012, Cadillac Fairview bought out the leases of Sears Canada in five stores for $400 million, including the lease of the flagship Sears at Toronto Eaton Centre.  Many of the former Sears locations, including the one at Eaton Centre, became Nordstrom.  In 2014, it purchased the Toronto flagship store of Hudson's Bay Company for $650 million.

On September 21, 2015, Cadillac Fairview rebranded its shopping centre properties, adding the prefix "CF" in front of each shopping centre name and phasing out individual mall logos in favour of a standardized logo format and image campaign.  In January 2017, Cadillac Fairview sold a 50% interest in its Vancouver portfolio to the Ontario Pension Board and the Workplace Safety and Insurance Board.  Financial terms were not disclosed, but the deal involved 4 million square feet of leasable space in the Pacific Centre and 12 office properties.  In September 2017, it announced it would become a national partner to the Canadian Olympic Committee.

Privacy issues 
In July 2018, Cadillac Fairview disclosed that it had been employing facial recognition technology via embedded cameras on their mall directory kiosks, which collected anonymized information of the estimated age and gender of customers. The company stated that this information was being used to analyze mall traffic. Following an investigation by CBC News and the announcement of a government probe, Cadillac Fairview suspended the program.

On October 29, 2020, the federal privacy commissioner and his counterparts in Alberta and B.C. released a report detailing Cadillac Fairview's use of anonymous video analytics (AVA) to collect personally-identifiable information from mall visitors without meaningful consent. It found that at 12 properties, the company had used 5 million images from such kiosks to generate biometric representations of visitors' faces. It was also found that the biometric data had unknowingly been compiled into a database by a third-party technology provider "for no apparent purpose and with no justification", which "compounded the risk of potential use by unauthorized parties or, in the case of a data breach, by malicious actors". The report concluded that Cadillac Fairview had complied with their recommendations, with the exception of those "that speculate about hypothetical future uses of similar technology".

Cadillac Fairview defended the program, arguing that the cameras' use were covered by a general privacy notice located on entrance signage (which warned that premises were monitored for safety and security reasons, and referred users to a company privacy policy on the company website), that the images themselves were only stored temporarily for analysis before being deleted, and that they could not individually identify a visitor.

Properties
Cadillac Fairview owns, develops, and manages property, malls and large office and retail spaces across the Western Hemisphere, mostly in North America. Cadillac Fairview has also developed suburban housing, such as the Erin Mills "New Town".  Among its Canadian assets are one New Brunswick property, five Quebec properties, twenty-five Ontario properties, two Manitoba properties, eight Alberta properties, and fourteen British Columbia properties.

Cadillac Fairview's malls are generally large and high-quality, with high-end stores and high sales per square foot.  For instance, sales at the Toronto Eaton Centre, a CF mall, were $1500 per square foot, while lower-end malls have sales closer to $325 per square foot.  Cadillac Fairview has actively tried to sell weak malls, reducing its mall count from a high of 40 to around 20 in 2017.

Notable properties managed by Cadillac Fairview, some co-owned with (or managed on behalf of) other investors, are listed below.

Notable former properties

References

External links
Official website

1974 establishments in Ontario
 
Companies based in Toronto
Real estate companies established in 1974
Real estate companies of Canada
Shopping center management firms
2000 mergers and acquisitions